The third season of The Cleveland Show aired on the Fox network from September 25, 2011, to May 20, 2012. On June 10, 2010, it was announced that the series had been renewed for a third season. According to co-creator Mike Henry, musical guests in season three were originally to include Kanye West, will.i.am, Nicki Minaj, Bruno Mars, Chris Brown, Darren Criss, Questlove, and Fergie. With the exception of Fergie and Darren Criss, these guests' appearances were instead in season four. The hurricane-themed crossover episode with Family Guy and American Dad! aired on October 2, 2011. It was originally going to air in the second season, but was postponed due to the 2011 Super Outbreak in the Southern United States.

Cast and characters

 Mike Henry as Cleveland Brown and Rallo Tubbs
 Sanaa Lathan as Donna Tubbs Brown
 Reagan Gomez-Preston as Roberta Tubbs
 Kevin Michael Richardson as Cleveland Brown Jr.

Episode list

Reception
Unlike the first season, this season received a more positive reception, in comparison to the first season. The Rotten Tomatoes score is a 63%, a 19% improvement over the previous season.

Home media

Notes

References

2011 American television seasons
2012 American television seasons
3